Rachel Aggs is a musician from London. Primarily known for her distinctive guitar work, influenced by both West African highlife and post-punk, she also sings and plays the violin.

Career
She has been playing with the band Trash Kit since 2009, with Ros Murray and Rachel Horwood, which released an eponymous debut album on the Upset! The Rhythm Indie-label in 2010 and a second album, Confidence, in 2014.   

She has also been a member of Shopping, formed with Andrew Milk and Billy Easter, since 2012. Other bands have included The Madrigals, Covergirl, Golden Grrrls, and Sacred Paws, who released their debut EP in 2015.

In June 2017, Sacred Paws debut album Strike A Match, released the previous January, was awarded Scottish Album of the Year.

She has written several zines, including I Trust My Guitar, and was involved with the Power Lunches venue in Dalston, East London.

She was a contributor to performance of the Pauline Oliveros score To Valerie Solanas and Marilyn Monroe, In Recognition of their Desperation in a performance in the Turbine Hall, Tate Modern, 2012. As well as on a second occasion in a film-based performance with other musicians Peaches, Catriona Shaw, Verity Susman, Ginger Brooks Takahashi, and William Wheeler in a film of the same name by artists Pauline Boudry / Renate Lorenz and shown at Museum of Modern Art, New York, in a special event with the artists, Oliveros and Gregg Bordowitz in May 2014.

On 14 April 2018 Aggs performed at the Barbican as part of a 12 guitarist group assembled by Thurston Moore; along with Deborah Goodge, Susan Stenger, Jonah Falco, and more.

In August 2020 it was announced Aggs would be releasing her first solo EP , recorded the year before, as part of the second series of Lost Map Records' 'Visitations' subscription service. Each release in the series is recorded by the artist whilst staying in a bothy on the isle of Eigg, where the label is based, in the Scottish Inner Hebrides.

Discography

Solo
 Visitations 0202 - Lost Map Records, 12” EP, CD, MP3 (2020)
 //TAPE 1// - Self release, Cassette, MP3 (2020)
 Another Road - Soundtrack, Hilda and The Mountain King, MP3 (2021)

Golden Grrrls
 Golden Grrrls – Slumberland Records / Night School, 12" LP, CD, MP3 (2013)

Sacred Paws
 Strike a Match – Rock Action, 12" LP, CD, MP3 (2017)
 Run Around the Sun – Rock Action (UK/EU) / Merge Records (US), 12" LP, CD, MP3 (2019)

Shopping
 Consumer Complaints - Mïlk Records/ FatCat Records, 12" LP, CD, MP3 (2013)
 Why Choose - FatCat Records, 12" LP, CD, MP3 (2015)
 The Official Body - FatCat Records, 12" LP, CD, MP3 (2018)
 All or Nothing - FatCat Records, 12" LP, CD, MP3 (2020)

Trash Kit
 Trash Kit - Upset The Rhythm, 12" LP, CD, MP3 (2010)
 Confidence - Upset The Rhythm, 12" LP, CD, MP3 (2014)
 Horizon - Upset The Rhythm, 12" LP, CD, MP3 (2019)

References

Underground punk scene in the United Kingdom
Living people
English women guitarists
English punk rock guitarists
English punk rock singers
Highlife musicians
English violinists
Year of birth missing (living people)
21st-century violinists
Women punk rock singers